Putnam Township is a township in Anderson County, Kansas, United States. As of the 2010 census, its population was 305.

History
Putnam Township was established in 1870. It was named for Leander Putnam.

Geography
According to the USGS, it contains one cemetery, West Scipio.

The stream of Dry Branch runs through this township.

References
 USGS Geographic Names Information System (GNIS)

External links
 US-Counties.com
 City-Data.com

Townships in Anderson County, Kansas
Townships in Kansas